Lusambo Airport  is an airport serving Lusambo, a town and territory in the Sankuru district of the Kasai-Oriental Province, Democratic Republic of the Congo.

See also

Transport in the Democratic Republic of the Congo
List of airports in the Democratic Republic of the Congo

References

External links
 OpenStreetMap - Lusambo Airport
 HERE Maps - Lusambo
 

Airports in Sankuru